The 1939 Iowa Hawkeyes football team represented the University of Iowa in the 1939 Big Ten Conference football season.  The team, nicknamed the Ironmen, was coached by Eddie Anderson and was led on the field by halfback Nile Kinnick.

Preseason
Iowa football was clearly struggling as 1939 began. In fact, the entire Iowa athletic department was in poor financial shape. The Great Depression had greatly impacted the small farming state, and Iowa's athletic receipts sharply declined throughout the 1930s.  The debt on Iowa Stadium, which was built in 1929, grew by the year.  The Hawkeyes had finished among the worst three teams in the Big Ten standings every year in the 1930s except 1933. Iowa had won just one Big Ten game in the last three years, and the team they beat, Chicago, announced that they would be dropping their football program following the 1939 season.  Chicago soon withdrew from the Big Ten Conference.

After compiling a 2-13-1 record in two years at Iowa, head football coach Irl Tubbs was fired.  Iowa athletic director E. G. Schroeder tried to inject some life into the program by hiring Dr. Eddie Anderson of Holy Cross. Anderson, a Mason City, Iowa native, played and coached under Knute Rockne at Notre Dame. He was the 1921 Notre Dame team captain, and Notre Dame went 28-1 in Anderson's last three years as a player. Ironically, the lone loss was to the 1921 Hawkeyes.

Around 85 players arrived for spring practice in 1939.  About fifty of them did not return in the fall.  Anderson installed a complicated new offense and conducted rigorous practices.  The 1939 Hawkeye team would be severely lacking in depth.  Anderson felt the Hawks could still be a good team in 1939, but only if the starters played significant minutes.  A coach brought in temporarily to help with Iowa's spring practice was quoted as saying when he left, "Among 5000 male students at the University of Iowa, there are only five real football players."

Michigan, Minnesota, Northwestern, and Ohio State were the Big Ten favorites for the 1939 season, while many sportswriters liked Purdue.  Notre Dame was also highly ranked nationally.  Iowa was picked at the bottom of the Big Ten.

Before the season, Iowa's best player appeared to be Nile Kinnick.  Kinnick was an all-Big Ten selection as a sophomore, when he led the nation in punting average, but he struggled through an injury-riddled junior season.  As a result, end Erwin Prasse, an all-Big Ten selection in 1938, was elected as the team captain of the 1939 Hawkeyes.  However, Kinnick had recovered from his injuries and was ready for a standout senior season.

Schedule

Roster

Game summaries

South Dakota

After a few uneventful series, Iowa got its first touchdown of the year on a 65-yard touchdown run by Kinnick.  The Hawkeyes broke the game open in the second quarter, as Kinnick scored three touchdowns (two rushing, one passing) in the period.

Coach Anderson pulled many of his starters at halftime, but Vollenweider returned the second half kickoff 92 yards for a touchdown.  Anderson, upset with the futility of the offense in the second half, reinserted Kinnick into the lineup with less than a minute remaining in the game.  Kinnick quickly led Iowa down the field and passed for the touchdown, his fifth of the game.

 The Hawkeyes started Diehl, Tollefson, Luebcke, Walker, and Enich on the line, Prasse and Evans at end, and Couppee, Busk, Murphy, and Kinnick in the backfield.
 Kinnick's father, Nile Kinnick Sr., traveled to Iowa City to see this game, thinking that it might be his only chance all season to see Iowa get a win.
 Green and Dean got interceptions for Iowa.  Moore and Couppee each recovered a fumble.
 It was Iowa's first home win since October 1937.
 Kinnick carried 8 times for 110 yards and three touchdowns.  His 23 points were the most in a game at Iowa since Oran "Nanny" Pape scored 24 points in a game in 1928.
 Kinnick would sit for most of the second half, the only game action he would miss until the season finale against Northwestern.
 Vollenweider's kickoff return set a stadium record that stood for 10 years.  It was broken by Bill Reichardt, who returned a kickoff 99 yards for a touchdown in 1949 against Oregon.  Vollenweider's touchdown was Iowa's only special teams touchdown of the season.

Indiana

Indiana jumped out to a quick 10-0 lead, but a 73-yard Kinnick punt changed field position to lead to Iowa's first touchdown.  Kinnick then used a 55-yard run to set up Iowa's second touchdown.  Prasse caught his second touchdown pass of the game to give Iowa 20 unanswered points, but Indiana countered with a touchdown pass of their own just before halftime.

Indiana dominated play in the third period, taking a nine-point lead.  Diehl got a crucial interception to stop another Indiana drive early in the fourth period, and Iowa responded with an 11 play drive to cut Indiana's lead to 3 points.  Green came up with an interception that gave Iowa the ball in Indiana territory.  Iowa advanced to the Indiana ten-yard line, but the Hoosiers drove Iowa five yards back in three plays to bring up fourth and goal from the fifteen.  Rather than attempt a game-tying field goal with minutes to play, Iowa went for the win and got it, as Kinnick fired his third touchdown pass to Prasse.

 The temperature at kickoff was in the mid 90s.  Several players had to leave the game due to dehydration, as the heat was oppressive.
 Iowa started the same players as they did against South Dakota.
 It was just the fourth time in 40 years that Iowa had won its first conference game.  It was Iowa's first conference victory at home since 1933 and Iowa's first victory over Indiana since 1921.
 23 Iowa players participated, the most in any game all season.
 Kinnick, Tollefson, and Walker played all 60 minutes.
 Couppee injured his shoulder and had to leave the game; he would wear a brace for the rest of the season.  Luebcke suffered a career-ending abdominal hernia.  Enich collapsed on the field from severe dehydration and was sent to the hospital.
 Before the game, the Indianapolis News reported that the Hoosiers had "a quiet confidence that they will win it. Of course, Iowa feels the same, maybe more so. And Indiana doesn't have a Kinnick."
 Kinnick's stat line was astounding.  He returned nine punts for 201 yards, both school records which still stand today. He had 103 yards rushing on 19 carries and one touchdown, 108 yards passing and three touchdowns, 201 punt return yards, 171 kick return yards, 4 punts for 172 yards, an interception return for 20 yards, and two extra point kicks.
 Prasse's three touchdowns receiving set a stadium record that stood for 66 years.  It was finally broken by Ed Hinkel, who caught four touchdowns against Minnesota in 2005.

Michigan

An early Kinnick touchdown pass was not enough for the Hawks, as Michigan scored the last 27 points of the game.  Iowa outgained the Wolverines by over 100 yards, but turnovers and special teams woes doomed the Hawkeyes to their only defeat of the season.  Kinnick fumbled a Michigan punt, which set up Michigan's game tying score.  An Iowa drive to the Michigan 12-yard line was halted when Harmon intercepted a Kinnick pass attempt for Prasse in end zone.

A long punt return led to Michigan's second score, and Kinnick's only blocked punt of the season gave Michigan position for a third touchdown.  Iowa's best field position of the second half saw Iowa with the ball at the Michigan 18-yard line.  Tom Harmon sealed the game for Michigan when he snatched Kinnick's pass for the end zone and returned it 90 yards for the Wolverines' fourth touchdown.

 The Hawkeyes started Diehl, Tollefson, Snider, Walker, and Enich on the line, Prasse and Norgaard at end, and Couppee, Dean, Murphy, and Kinnick in the backfield.
 Kinnick and Enich played all 60 minutes.
 Couppee's shoulder injury forced him out of the game.  Walker severely injured his knee and was thought to possibly be out for the season.  Diehl left the game due to injury as well.
 Archie Kodros, who would later serve as assistant football coach at Iowa from 1952–65, was the Michigan team captain.
 Forest Evashevski, who would become a Hall of Fame coach for the Hawkeyes, was also on the 1939 Michigan team.

Wisconsin

Iowa had yielded 34 unanswered points going back to the Michigan game after Wisconsin scored the game's opening touchdown.  But Kinnick returned the ensuing kickoff 55 yards to the Wisconsin 35-yard line, and the Hawkeyes responded with a touchdown of their own.  Iowa's missed extra point gave Wisconsin a one-point halftime advantage.

Iowa briefly pulled ahead on a Kinnick touchdown pass before Wisconsin drove 79 yards to reclaim the lead at 13-12.  A Dean interception early in the final period gave Kinnick the opportunity to complete another game-clinching, fourth-quarter touchdown.  Hawkins and Dean each intercepted passes late to cut off Badger rallies.

 The Hawkeyes started Diehl, Tollefson, Bergstrom, Hawkins, and Enich on the line, Smith and Norgaard at end, and Couppee, McLain, Murphy, and Kinnick in the backfield.
 Enich, Hawkins, Tollefson, Bergstrom, and Kinnick played all 60 minutes.
 Diehl suffered a season ending knee injury in the game, while Norgaard suffered a career ending neck injury.
 The term "Ironmen" to describe the 1939 Hawkeyes gained widespread use after this game.
 Prasse did not start the game, as Anderson elected bring him off of the bench.  As a result, Kinnick served as the acting captain this game.
 It was Dad's Day in Madison.

Purdue

The Boilermakers had practiced all week to shut down Kinnick's passing, and Purdue's Jack Brown intercepted four Kinnick passes in the game.  Iowa had an apparent touchdown negated by a false start on Ken Pettit in the first half, and turnovers killed the other Iowa drives.  A fumble ended Purdue's only serious scoring threat of a scoreless first half.

The defensive struggle continued until early in the fourth quarter, when Iowa forced a punt deep in Purdue territory.  Enich blocked the kick, and Prasse recovered to give Iowa field position.  Though Iowa turned the ball over on downs, the Hawkeyes soon forced another Purdue punt, this time from Purdue's end zone.  A bobbled snap allowed Iowa to tackle Brown for the safety and the game's first points.

A Kinnick punt late in the fourth quarter pinned Purdue deep in their own territory, and Iowa again forced Purdue to punt from their own end zone.  Enich came crashing through the line for his second blocked punt of the game, and Brown recovered it in the end zone for another Iowa safety.  Iowa then ran out the clock on one of the most bizarre final scores in Hawkeye football history.

 The Hawkeyes started Snider, Ken Pettit, Andruska, Bergstrom, and Enich on the line, Prasse and Evans at end, and Couppee, McLain, Murphy, and Kinnick in the backfield.
 Ken Pettit, Andruska, Bergstrom, Enich, Prasse, Evans, Couppee, and Kinnick played all 60 minutes.
 Dean injured his shoulder in the game and had to wear a brace for the remainder of the season.
 The Hawkeyes were a road underdog for the third straight game, as Purdue had been an early favorite to win the Big Ten title.
 Iowa held Purdue to 75 total yards for the game.
 It was Homecoming in West Lafayette.
 Anderson blasted Couppee at halftime, screaming, "When we get down on the goal line, there's just one guy on this football team that should get that football!  Do you even know who he is?  Why don't you meet Nile Kinnick!"  Anderson then forced Couppee to walk to Kinnick and "introduce" himself and shake his hand.
 When the team returned to Iowa City, they were greeted by thousands of Hawkeye fans who led the team downtown in a spontaneous parade.
 After the game, line coach Jim Harris quipped, "Enich hit a home run with the bases loaded."

Notre Dame

Both teams played very conservatively in the first half, as the teams punted back and forth.  Toward the end of the second quarter, Kinnick made a touchdown saving tackle on a Notre Dame run at the Notre Dame 41-yard line.  On the next play, a Notre Dame pass was intercepted by Kinnick at the Iowa 45-yard line, and Kinnick dodged several tacklers to return the ball 20 yards with less than two minutes remaining in the first half.

On the next play, Kinnick fired a pass for Dean in the end zone, but it was intercepted by Steve Sitko at the goal line.  Sitko returned the ball for a few yards before being hit hard by Andruska, forcing a fumble.  Dean and Evans recovered at the Notre Dame 4-yard line.  Rushes by Kinnick and Dean for no gain brought up third down, and Notre Dame called a time out.  Kinnick shifted to right halfback on third down and carried the ball over the goal line for the touchdown with forty seconds remaining in the half.  Kinnick added the extra point under a heavy rush to give Iowa a 7-0 halftime lead.

Most of the third quarter, like the first half, was just a long exchange of punts.  But late in the period, Notre Dame put together their best sustained drive of the game.  The third quarter ended with the Irish on the Iowa 10-yard line.  On the second play of the fourth quarter, Notre Dame rushed ahead for the touchdown.  But the critical extra point attempt missed wide left, and the Hawkeyes still held a one-point lead.

Iowa's defense continued for force punts from the Notre Dame offense, while Kinnick's booming punts kept Notre Dame on the other side of the field.  With under two minutes remaining in the game, Kinnick's 16th punt of the game traveled 63 yards and rolled out of bounds at the Notre Dame 6-yard line, effectively sealing the Iowa victory.

 Iowa started the same players as they did against Purdue.
 Ken Pettit, Andruska, Bergstrom, Enich, Prasse, Evans, Couppee, and Kinnick played the full 60 minutes.
 Notre Dame was ranked #3 in the nation by the Associated Press.
 The game was played on Armistice Day, now known as Veteran's Day.  Kinnick was later killed in a plane crash, training to fight in the Navy during World War II.
 Kinnick kicked 16 punts for 731 yards.  Both are school records for Iowa that still stand today.
 Notre Dame switched from (navy) blue jerseys to green jerseys at halftime, probably to avoid confusion with Iowa's black home jerseys.
 The University of Iowa canceled classes on Monday following the victory.
 When huddling before Kinnick's touchdown (one of perhaps three convened by Couppee all year), a play was called for Buzz Dean, but he had a separated shoulder.
 Ironically, considering his halftime tirade in favor of running Kinnick the week before against Purdue, Anderson was reported to have been yelling, "Don't give the ball to Kinnick! Everybody in the stadium knows you're gonna give the ball to Kinnick!" at Couppee during the aforementioned huddle.  He got the ball anyway and scored.

Minnesota

Minnesota missed a field goal in the first period, and Sonny Franck intercepted a Kinnick pass in Minnesota territory to end Iowa's first scoring threat.  Minnesota converted in the second quarter on their second field goal try of the game, and Harold Van Every made a spectacular one-handed interception of a Kinnick pass deep in Gopher territory late in the first half to keep Iowa scoreless at halftime.

A Minnesota punt pinned the Hawkeyes at their own four-yard line in the third quarter, and a 20-yard return of the ensuing Iowa punt gave the Gophers the ball at Iowa's 28-yard line.  A series of running plays brought up fourth and goal from the Iowa six-yard line.  Franck rushed toward the end zone, and officials ruled that Franck narrowly crossed the goal line, despite Iowa's protests.  The controversial touchdown gave Minnesota a nine-point lead.

But Kinnick rallied Iowa again.  Early in the fourth quarter, Kinnick led Iowa on a quick five play, 79-yard drive for a touchdown to cut the Minnesota lead to two points.  With five minutes remaining, Iowa took over possession at their own 21-yard line.  After a few plays, Kinnick threw an interception, but Minnesota was flagged for interference, giving Iowa the ball at midfield.  Three plays later, Kinnick threw the game-winning touchdown pass to Green with three minutes left in the game.  Minnesota's final threat was eliminated when Kinnick came up with an interception at midfield.

 The Hawkeyes had the same starting lineup for the third straight week.
 Ken Pettit, Andruska, Bergstrom, Enich, Prasse, Evans, and Kinnick played the full 60 minutes.
 Iowa was ranked 15th in the Associated Press poll at the time of the game, the first time in Iowa history that the Hawkeyes had been ranked.
 Couppee sprained his other shoulder and injured his ribs.  Andruska played the entire second half with a broken wrist; he would miss the Northwestern game.  Ken Pettit badly injured his wrist, but he would not allow it to be x-rayed for fear of being forced to miss the Northwestern game.  Gallagher badly sprained his shoulder.  Dean and Tollefson suffered leg injuries, and Prasse had a badly bruised arm.
 Swelling and numbness in Kinnick's passing hand allowed him to throw only every other play so he could rest it on running plays.
 With the win, Iowa won the Floyd of Rosedale trophy for the first time.
 One Chicago paper wrote, "Nile Kinnick 13, Minnesota 9; tersely, that tells the story of the most spectacular football game in modern Big Ten history."
 James Kearns of the Chicago Daily News wrote, "There's a golden helmet riding on a human sea across Iowa's football field in the twilight here. Now the helmet rises as wave upon wave of humanity pours onto the field. There's a boy under the helmet, which is shining like a crown on his head. A golden #24 gleams on his slumping, tired shoulders. The boy is Nile Clarke Kinnick Jr., who has, just now, risen above all the defenses that could be raised against him...leading a frenzied little band of Iowa football players to a victory which was impossible. They couldn't win, but they did."
 It was Iowa's fourth Big Ten win, the most at Iowa since 1922.

Northwestern

Iowa spent most of the first half in Northwestern territory, but five first half fumbles, including one at the Northwestern 3-yard line, stopped all Hawkeye scoring threats.  A 74-yard Northwestern punt changed field position, and Northwestern put together a good drive late in the first half.  The Wildcats scored on a touchdown run with twenty seconds remaining in the first half to take a seven-point halftime lead.

Northwestern's third quarter drives were stopped by turnovers, but Iowa could not capitalize on many of them as Kinnick left the game with a separated shoulder.  Enich recovered a Wildcat fumble, Northwestern's third turnover of the period, at the Iowa 22-yard line to give Iowa good field position going into the fourth quarter.  Northwestern was called for interference on Prasse on a fourth down pass into the end zone, giving Iowa field position to score the game-tying touchdown.

Midway through the fourth quarter, the Wildcats were able to drive to the Iowa goal line.  But an Enich tackle stopped Northwestern for no gain on fourth and goal inside the Iowa one-yard line.  Northwestern later missed a desperation field goal, and Iowa ran out the clock to end the game with a 7-7 tie.

 The Hawkeyes started Snider, Ken Pettit, Frye, Bergstrom, and Enich on the line, Prasse and Evans at end, and Couppee, McLain, Murphy, and Kinnick in the backfield.
 Snider, Ken Pettit, Frye, Enich, Prasse, and Evans played the full 60 minutes.
 Bergstrom and Murphy suffered season ending injuries; they were replaced by Vollenweider and Walker, who had not fully recovered from his knee injury.  Tollefson and Snider were injured in the game as well.
 The tie cost Iowa the 1939 Big Ten title.  Iowa, with a 4-1-1 conference record, finished the season second in the Big Ten standings behind conference champion Ohio State, which had a 5-1 Big Ten record.  Had Iowa won the game, they would have shared the title as the teams had not played.
 Anderson pulled Couppee late in the game, as Couppee threw passes frantically on the last drive in an attempt to win the game.  Anderson, who erroneously thought a tie would still give Iowa a share of the conference title (which went to Ohio State), was convinced that Couppee had suffered a concussion, and sent in the backup quarterback with instructions to "sit on the ball."  Anderson later apologized to Couppee for benching him.

Postseason

 Kinnick threw for 638 yards and 11 touchdowns on only 31 passes and ran for 374 yards and 5 touchdowns.
 Kinnick was involved in 107 of the 130 points that Iowa scored and played 402 of a possible 420 minutes.
 Kinnick set the school record with eight interceptions in a season, a record which still stands today.
 Nile Kinnick won virtually every major award in the country. He was named:
 A consensus first team All-American
 The Big Ten MVP
 The Walter Camp Award winner 
 The Maxwell Award winner
 The Heisman Trophy winner
 Associated Press Male Athlete of the Year
 Iowa was ranked ninth in the final Associated Press (AP) poll.
 Iowa did not attempt a field goal all season.
 Erwin Prasse was a second team All-American.
 Mike Enich actually played more minutes in 1939 than Nile Kinnick.  In the final seven games, Kinnick played six complete games before leaving in the third quarter against Northwestern.  Enich left the Indiana game in the fourth quarter before finishing the season by playing six complete games.
 Nile Kinnick, Erwin Prasse, and Mike Enich were named all-Big Ten.

References

 75 Years With The Fighting Hawkeyes, by Bert McCrane & Dick Lamb (ASIN: B0007E01F8)
 The Ironmen, by Scott Fisher 
 Kinnick: The Man and the Legend, by Derald W. Stump (ASIN: B0006ETB3W) 
 One Magic Year: 1939, An Ironman Remembers, by Al Couppee (ASIN: B00071TZKS)

Iowa
Iowa Hawkeyes football seasons
Iowa Hawkeyes football